The New Economic Policy (NEP) was an economic policy of the Soviet Union proposed by Vladimir Lenin in 1921 as a temporary expedient. Lenin characterized the NEP in 1922 as an economic system that would include "a free market and capitalism, both subject to state control", while socialized state enterprises would operate on "a profit basis".

The NEP represented a more market-oriented economic policy (deemed necessary after the Russian Civil War of 1918 to 1922) to foster the economy of the country, which had suffered severely since 1915. The Soviet authorities partially revoked the complete nationalization of industry (established during the period of war communism of 1918 to 1921) and introduced a mixed economy which allowed private individuals to own small and medium sized enterprises, while the state continued to control large industries, banks and foreign trade. In addition, the NEP abolished forced grain-requisition and introduced a tax on farmers, payable in the form of raw agricultural product. The Bolshevik government adopted the NEP in the course of the 10th Congress of the All-Russian Communist Party (March 1921) and promulgated it by a decree on 21 March 1921: "On the Replacement of grain-requisition by food tax". Further decrees refined the policy. Other policies included monetary reform (1922–1924) and the attraction of foreign capital.

The NEP created a new category of people called NEPmen (нэпманы) (nouveau riches). Joseph Stalin abandoned the NEP in 1928 with the Great Break.

Beginnings 
In November 1917, the Bolsheviks seized control of key centres in Russia. This led to the Russian Civil War of 1917–1922, which pitted the Bolsheviks and their allies against the Whites and other counter-revolutionary forces. During this period the Bolsheviks attempted to administrate Russia's economy purely by decree, a policy of the War Communism. Farmers and factory workers were ordered to produce, and food and goods were seized and issued by decree. While this policy enabled the Bolshevik regime to overcome some initial difficulties, it soon caused economic disruptions and hardships. Producers who were not directly compensated for their labor often stopped working, leading to widespread shortages. Combined with the devastation of the war, these were major hardships for the Russian people and diminished popular support for the Bolsheviks.

At the end of the Civil War, the Bolsheviks controlled Russian cities, but 80% of the Russian population were peasants. Although almost all the fighting had occurred outside urban areas, urban populations decreased substantially. The war disrupted transportation (especially railroads), and basic public services. Infectious diseases thrived, especially typhus. Shipments of food and fuel by railroad and by water dramatically decreased. City residents first experienced a shortage of heating oil, then coal, until they resorted to wood. Populations in northern towns (excluding capital cities) declined an average of 24%. Northern towns received less food than towns in the agricultural south. Petrograd alone lost 850,000 people, half of the urban population decline during the Civil War. Hunger and poor conditions drove residents out of cities. Workers migrated south to get peasants' surpluses. Recent migrants to cities left because they still had ties to villages.

Urban workers formed the core of Bolshevik support, so the exodus posed a serious problem. Factory production severely slowed or halted. Factories lacked 30,000 workers in 1919. To survive, city dwellers sold personal valuables, made artisan craft-goods for sale or barter, and planted gardens. The acute need for food drove them to obtain 50–60% of food through illegal trading (see meshochnik). The shortage of cash caused the black market to use a barter system, which was inefficient. Drought and frost led to the Russian famine of 1921, in which millions starved to death, especially in the Volga region, and urban support for the Bolshevik party eroded. When no bread arrived in Moscow in 1921, workers became hungry and disillusioned. They organised demonstrations against the Bolshevik Party's policy of privileged rations, in which the Red Army, Party members, and students received rations first. The Kronstadt rebellion of soldiers and sailors broke out in March 1921, fueled by anarchism and populism. In 1921 Lenin replaced the food requisitioning policy with a tax, signaling the inauguration of the New Economic Policy.

Policies 

The laws sanctioned the co-existence of private and public sectors, which were incorporated in the NEP, which was a state oriented "mixed economy". The NEP represented a move away from full nationalization of certain parts of industries. Some kinds of foreign investments were expected by the Soviet Union under the NEP, in order to fund industrial and developmental projects with foreign exchange or technology requirements.

The NEP was primarily a new agricultural policy. The Bolsheviks viewed traditional village life as conservative and backward. With the NEP, the state only allowed private landholdings because the idea of collectivized farming had met strong opposition.

Lenin understood that economic conditions were dire, so he opened up markets to a greater degree of free trade, hoping to motivate the population to increase production. Under the NEP, not only were "private property, private enterprise, and private profit largely restored in Lenin's Russia," but Lenin's regime turned to international capitalism for assistance, willing to provide "generous concessions to foreign capitalism." Lenin took the position that in order to achieve socialism, he had to create "the missing material prerequisites" of modernization and industrial development that made it imperative for Soviet Russia to "fall back on a centrally supervised market-influenced program of state capitalism". Lenin was following Karl Marx's precepts that a nation must first reach "full maturation of capitalism as the precondition for socialist realization." Future years would use the term Marxism–Leninism to describe Lenin's approach to economic policies which were seen to favor policies that moved the country toward communism. The main policy Lenin used was an end to grain requisitions and instead instituted a tax on the peasants, thereby allowing them to keep and trade part of their produce. At first, this tax was paid in kind, but as the currency became more stable in 1924, it was changed to a cash payment. This increased the peasants' incentive to produce, and in response production jumped by 40% after the drought and famine of 1921–22.

NEP economic reforms aimed to take a step back from central planning and allow the economy to become more independent. NEP labor reforms tied labor to productivity, incentivizing the reduction of costs and the redoubled efforts of labor. Labor unions became independent civic organizations. NEP reforms also opened up government positions to the most qualified workers. The NEP gave opportunities for the government to use engineers, specialists, and intelligentsia for cost accounting, equipment purchasing, efficiency procedures, railway construction, and industrial administration. A new class of "NEPmen" thrived. These private traders opened up urban firms hiring up to 20 workers. NEPmen also included rural artisan craftsmen selling their wares on the private market.

Disagreements in leadership 
Lenin considered the NEP as a strategic retreat from socialism. He believed it was capitalism, but justified it by insisting that it was a different type of capitalism, "state capitalism", the last stage of capitalism before socialism evolved. While Stalin seemed receptive towards Lenin's shift in policy towards a state capitalist system, he stated in the Twelfth Party Congress in April 1923 that it allowed the "growth of nationalistic and reactionary thinking..". He also states that in the recent Central Committee plenum there were speeches made which were incompatible with communism, all of which were ultimately caused by the NEP. These statements were made just after Lenin was incapacitated by strokes.

Leon Trotsky and Joseph Stalin disagreed over how to develop the Soviet economy. Trotsky, supported by radical members of the Communist Party, believed that socialism in Russia would only survive if the state controlled the allocation of all output. Trotsky believed that the state should repossess all output to invest in capital formation. On the other hand, Stalin supported the more moderate members of the Communist Party and advocated for a state-run capitalist economy. Stalin managed to wrest control of the Communist Party from Trotsky. After defeating the Trotsky faction, Stalin reversed his opinions about economic policy and implemented the first five-year plan.

Results 

After the New Economic Policy was instituted, agricultural production increased greatly. In order to stimulate economic growth, farmers were given the opportunity to sell portions of their crops to the government in exchange for monetary compensation. Farmers now had the option to sell some of their produce, giving them a personal economic incentive to produce more grain. This incentive, coupled with the breakup of the quasi-feudal landed estates, surpassed pre-Revolution agricultural production. The agricultural sector became increasingly reliant on small family farms, while heavy industries, banks, and financial institutions remained owned and run by the state. This created an imbalance in the economy where the agricultural sector was growing much faster than heavy industry. To maintain their income, factories raised prices. Due to the rising cost of manufactured goods, peasants had to produce much more wheat to buy these consumer goods, which increased supply and thus lowered the price of these agricultural products. This fall in prices of agricultural goods and sharp rise in prices of industrial products was known as the Scissors Crisis (due to the crossing of graphs of the prices of the two types of product). Peasants began withholding their surpluses in wait for higher prices, or sold them to "NEPmen" (traders and middle-men) who re-sold them at high prices. Many Communist Party members considered this an exploitation of urban consumers. To lower the price of consumer goods, the state took measures to decrease inflation and enact reforms on the internal practices of the factories. The government also fixed prices, in an attempt to halt the scissor effect.

The NEP succeeded in creating an economic recovery after the devastation of World War I, the Russian Revolution, and the Russian Civil War. By 1925, in the wake of Lenin's NEP, a "... major transformation was occurring politically, economically, culturally and spiritually." Small-scale and light industries were largely in the hands of private entrepreneurs or cooperatives. By 1928, agricultural and industrial production had been restored to the 1913 (pre-World War I) level.

End of NEP 
By 1924, the year of Lenin's death, Nikolai Bukharin had become the foremost supporter of the New Economic Policy. The USSR abandoned NEP in 1928 after Joseph Stalin obtained a position of leadership during the Great Break. Stalin was initially noncommitted to the NEP. Stalin then enacted a system of collectivization during the Grain Procurement Crisis of 1928 and saw the need to quickly accumulate capital for the vast industrialization programme introduced with the Five Year Plans starting in 1928. The Bolsheviks hoped that the USSR's industrial base would reach the level of capitalist countries in the West, to avoid losing a future war. (Stalin proclaimed, "Either we do it, or we shall be crushed.") Stalin asserted that the grain crisis was caused by kulaks – relatively wealthy farmers who allegedly "hoarded" grain and participated in "speculation of agricultural produce". He also considered peasant farms too small to support the massive agricultural demands of the Soviet Union's push for rapid industrialization, and Soviet economists claimed that only large collective farms could support such an expansion. Accordingly, Stalin imposed collectivization of agriculture. Land held by the kulaks was seized and given to agricultural cooperatives (kolkhozes and sovkhozes).

Lenin and his followers saw the NEP as an interim measure. However, it proved highly unpopular with the Left Opposition in the Bolshevik Party because of its compromise with some capitalist elements and the relinquishment of state control. The Left saw the NEP as a betrayal of Communist principles, and believed it would have a negative long-term economic effect, so they wanted a fully planned economy instead. In particular, the NEP fostered a class of traders ("NEPmen") whom the Communists regarded as "class enemies" of the working class. Vladimir Lenin is quoted to have said "For a year we have been retreating. On behalf of the Party we must now call a halt. The purpose pursued by the retreat has been achieved. This period is drawing, or has drawn, to a close." which implies Lenin believed the NEP should have ended in his lifetime. Lenin had also been known to say about NEP, "We are taking one step backward, to take two steps forward later", suggesting that, though the NEP pointed in another direction, it would provide the economic conditions necessary for socialism eventually to evolve.

After only seven years of NEP, Lenin's successor Stalin introduced full central planning, re-nationalized much of the economy, and from the late 1920s onwards introduced a policy of rapid industrialization. Stalin's collectivization of agriculture was his most notable departure from the NEP approach.

Influence 
Pantsov and Levine see many of the post-Mao economic reforms of the Chinese Communist Party's former paramount leader Deng Xiaoping away from a command economy and towards a "socialist market economy" during the 1980s as influenced by the NEP: "It will be recalled that Deng Xiaoping himself had studied Marxism from the works of the Bolshevik leaders who had propounded NEP. He drew on ideas from NEP when he spoke of his own reforms. In 1985, he openly acknowledged that 'perhaps' the most correct model of socialism was the New Economic Policy of the USSR."

See also 
 Capital accumulation
 Corporatism
 Dirigisme
 Family in the Soviet Union
 Hyperinflation in early Soviet Russia
 Left Opposition
 Mixed economy
 Primitive socialist accumulation
 Scissors Crisis
 Soviet-type economic planning
 State capitalism

Multimedia 
 Vladimir I. Lenin: About Natural Tax (Text of the speech in Russian).

Footnotes

Further reading 
 Ball, Alan M.  Russia's Last Capitalists: The NEPmen, 1921–1929. (U of California Press, 1987). online free
 Bandera, V. N. "The New Economic Policy (NEP) as an economic system." Journal of Political Economy 71.3 (1963): 265–279. online
 Davies, R. W. (ed.) (1991). From Tsarism to the New Economic Policy: Continuity and Change in the Economy of the USSR.  Ithaca, NY: Cornell University Press.
 Fitzpatrick, Sheila, et al. (ed.) (1991). Russia in the Era of NEP. Bloomington, IN:  Indiana University Press.
 Kenez, Peter. A History of the Soviet Union from the Beginning to the End. (Cambridge: Cambridge University Press), 2006.
 Nenovsky. N, (2006). "Lenin and the Currency Competition: Reflections on the NEP Experience (1922–1924)." Turin, Italy: International Center of Economic Research Working Paper No. 22, 2006
 Richman, Sheldon L. "War Communism to NEP: The Road from Serfdom." The Journal of Libertarian Studies V, no. 1, 1981.
 Siegelbaum, Lewis H. Soviet State and Society: Between Revolutions, 1918–1929. (Cambridge: Cambridge UP), 1992.
 Timoshenko, Vladimir P. Agricultural Russia and the Wheat Problem. (Stanford, CA: Food Research Institute, Stanford University), 1932.

External links 
 The New Economic Policy And The Tasks Of The Political Education Departments V.I Lenin 17 Oct. 1921.
 Role and Functions of the Trade Unions Under The New Economic Policy V. I. Lenin. 12 Jan 1922.
 Sahoboss. "The Impact of Lenin and Stalin's Policies on the Rights of the Russian People." South African History Online, 8 May 2017.

1921 establishments in Russia
1928 disestablishments
1920s economic history
Economic history of the Soviet Union
1920s in the Soviet Union
Soviet phraseology
1921 in economics
Reform in the Soviet Union